Leucopogon diversifolius is a species of flowering plant in the heath family Ericaceae and is endemic to the south-west of Western Australia. It is an erect shrub with more or less glabrous young branchlets, spirally arranged, erect, broadly egg-shaped, elliptic or more or less circular leaves, and white, broadly bell-shaped flowers sometimes with a pink tinge.

Description

Taxonomy and naming
This leucopogon as was first formally described in 2009 by Michael Clyde Hislop who gave it the name Leucopogon heterophyllus in the journal Nuytsia from specimens he collected near Munglinup in 2007, but that name was illegitimate because it had already been used for a different species, now known as Leucopogon fasciculatus. In 2015, Hislop changed the name to Leucopogon diversifolius. The specific epithet (diversifolius) means "various-leaved", referring to the variable leaf morphology of this species.

Distribution and habitat
Leucopogon diversifolius grows in the shrub layer of mallee woodlands and occurs mainly between Ravensthorpe, Lake King and Cascade in the Esperance Plains and Mallee bioregions in south-western Western Australia.

Conservation status
Leucopogon diversifolius is classified as "not threatened" by the Western Australian Government Department of Biodiversity, Conservation and Attractions

References

diversifolius
Ericales of Australia
Flora of Western Australia
Plants described in 2009